The 1987 Tolly Ales English Professional Championship was a professional non-ranking snooker tournament, which took place in February 1987 in Ipswich, England.

Tony Meo won the title by defeating Les Dodd 9–5 in the final.

Main draw

Last 32 was played at Bristol between 16 and 17 December 1986.

References

English Professional Championship
English Professional Championship
English Professional Championship
English Professional Championship